Pavlo Heorhiyovych Tarnovetskyy ( (born 21 February 1961) is a retired decathlete who represented the Soviet Union during his active career. He was born  in Storozhynets, Ukrainian SSR.

He won the bronze medal at the 1987 World Championships with a score of 8375 points. This was enough to place third on the world top list that season.

Achievements

External links

1961 births
Living people
Soviet decathletes
Athletes (track and field) at the 1988 Summer Olympics
Olympic athletes of the Soviet Union
World Athletics Championships medalists
People from Storozhynets